Gratama is a surname of Dutch origin. Notable people with the surname are as follows:

 Gerrit David Gratama (1874–1965), Dutch artist and writer
 Jan Gratama (1877–1947), Dutch architect
 Lina Gratama (1875–1946), Dutch painter, art historian, and political activist

Surnames of Dutch origin